USS Baltimore (CA-68) was the lead ship of her class of heavy cruiser, the fifth ship of the United States Navy named after the city of Baltimore, Maryland.

Design 
The ship had a crew of 1,142 officers and enlisted men.

Construction and World War II 

She was laid down on 26 May 1941 at Bethlehem Steel Company's Fore River Shipyard in Quincy, Massachusetts, launched on 28 July 1942, sponsored by the wife of Mayor of Baltimore Howard W. Jackson, commissioned on 15 April 1943.

Following fitting-out, Baltimore departed for Hampton Roads on 17 June 1943, briefly visited the United States Naval Academy at Annapolis, Maryland on 20 June, then conducted exercises off the Virginia Capes two days later. She went to Norfolk, Virginia for upkeep between 24 June and 1 July, when she departed for shakedown off Trinidad. Operating from Port of Spain, conducting gunnery training before returning to Hampton Roads on 24 July. Four days later, she steamed to Boston for post-shakedown availability (repairs to correct deficiencies found during shakedown) and to correct a leak in the main battery hydraulic piping. Returning to Norfolk in early September after the completion of the repairs, Baltimore and the destroyer USS Sigourney departed for the west coast. They transited the Panama Canal on 25 September and arrived in San Diego on 4 October, after which she trained off the west coast from 9 to 13 October. Departing San Diego three days later, the cruiser arrived at Pearl Harbor independently on 29 October after a brief stopover at San Francisco.

Between November 1943 and June 1944 Baltimore was a unit of the fire support and covering forces at the Makin Islands landings (20 November – 4 December 1943); Kwajalein invasion (29 January – 8 February 1944), and the Truk raid (16–17 February) and Eniwetok seizure (17 February – 2 March). On the 17th, Lt. (j.g.) Denver M. Baxter, USNR, flying one of the heavy cruiser's Vought OS2U Kingfishers, covered by two Grumman F6F Hellcats, rescued Lt. (jg.) George M. Blair, USNR, of VF-9 less than 6,000 yards from Dublon Island inside Truk lagoon where he had ditched his Hellcat.

Baltimore continued to provide fire support in the Marianas attacks (21–22 February), the Palau-Yap-Ulithi-Woleai raid (30 March – 1 April), the Hollandia (currently known as Jayapura) landing (21–24 April); the Truk-Satawan-Ponape raid (29 April – 1 May), air strikes against Marcus Island (19–20 May) and Wake Island (23 May), the Saipan invasion (11–24 June); and the Battle of the Philippine Sea (19–20 June).

Returning to the United States in July 1944, she embarked President Franklin D. Roosevelt and his party and steamed to Pearl Harbor. After meeting with Admiral Chester Nimitz and General Douglas MacArthur, the President was ferried to Alaska where he departed Baltimore 9 August 1944.

Returning to the war zone in November 1944, she was assigned to the 3rd Fleet and participated in the attacks on Luzon (14–16 December 1944; and 6–7 January 1945); Taiwan (3–4, 9, 15, and 21 January), the China coast (12 and 16 January), and Okinawa (22 January).

On 26 January she joined the 5th Fleet for her final operations of the war: Honshū Island attacks (16–17 February), Iwo Jima operation (19 February – 5 March) and the 5th Fleet raids in support of the Okinawa operation (18 March – 10 June).

Postwar 
Baltimore served as a unit of the "Magic Carpet" fleet and then as a part of the naval occupation force in Japan (29 November 1945 – 17 February 1946). Departing the Far East 17 February 1946 she returned to the United States and was decommissioned and placed in reserve on 8 July 1946 at Bremerton, Washington.

Baltimore was recommissioned 28 November 1951 and assigned to the U.S. Atlantic Fleet, deployed with the 6th Fleet in the Mediterranean during the summers of 1952, 1953, and 1954. In June 1953 she represented the United States Navy in the British Fleet Review at Spithead. On 5 January 1955 she was transferred to the Pacific Fleet and was deployed with the 7th Fleet in the Far East between February and August 1955.
Baltimore commenced pre-inactivation overhaul on her return from the Far East, went out of commission in reserve at Bremerton, on 31 May 1956 after just 6.75 years of active service. She was struck from the Navy List 15 February 1971, sold 10 April 1972 to Zidell Ship Dismantling Company Portland, Oregon and subsequently scrapped September 1972.

Awards 
Asiatic-Pacific Campaign Medal with nine battle stars 
World War II Victory Medal
Navy Occupation Medal with "EUROPE" and "ASIA" clasps
National Defense Service Medal

Alleged sinking by North Korea
The Victorious War Museum in Pyongyang, North Korea, has several exhibits that claim the Baltimore was sunk by Motor Torpedo Boats belonging to the Korean People's Navy on 2 July 1950. Exhibits include a poster and the "actual" boat which supposedly sank the American cruiser. However, the ship was in the U.S. Navy's decommissioned reserve from 1946 to 1951 before being recommissioned and assigned to the Atlantic Fleet. In 1955, the Baltimore was transferred to the Pacific Fleet two years after the end of the Korean War.

The actual battle involved  as well as the Royal Navy's sloop  and cruiser . Together they destroyed several North Korean torpedo boats without loss or damage.

References

Citations

Bibliography

External links

history.navy.mil: USS Baltimore

hazegray.org: USS Baltimore

Baltimore-class cruisers
World War II cruisers of the United States
Cold War cruisers of the United States
Ships built in Quincy, Massachusetts
1942 ships